Raúl Isiordia Ayón (born 22 December 1952) is a Mexican former football forward who played for Mexico in the 1978 FIFA World Cup.

Career
Born in Tepic, Isiordia began playing professional football with local side Coras de Tepic in the Segunda División de México. He later played in the Primera División with Atlético Español and C.F. Monterrey.

After he retired from playing, Isiordia became the president of his hometown club, Coras de Tepic, in the wake of its financial struggles from 1996 to 1999.

References

External links
 
 
 

1952 births
Living people
Mexico international footballers
1978 FIFA World Cup players
Association football forwards
Atlético Español footballers
C.F. Monterrey players
Coyotes Neza footballers
Tecos F.C. footballers
Tigres UANL footballers
Footballers from Nayarit
People from Tepic
CONCACAF Championship-winning players
Mexican footballers